Kang Yun-seong (강윤성) may refer to:
 Gang Yun-seong (died 1358), Goryeo person
 K (singer) (born 1983), South Korean singer
 Kang Yoon-sung (footballer) (born 1997), South Korean footballer